Fiona Melanie Wood  (born 2 February 1958) is an English-born Australian plastic surgeon working in Perth, Western Australia. She is the director of the Royal Perth Hospital burns unit and the Western Australia Burns Service. In addition, Wood is also a clinical professor with the School of Paediatrics and Child Health at the University of Western Australia and director of the McComb Research Foundation.

Early life and education
Wood was born in Yorkshire, England, 2 February 1958. She attended Ackworth School near Pontefract, West Yorkshire.  She was athletic as a child and hoped for a career as an Olympic sprinter, before training at a university and then St Thomas's Hospital Medical School in London, graduating from there in 1981.

Career and research
Wood worked at a major British hospital before marrying Western Australian born surgeon Tony Kierath and migrating to Perth with their first two children in 1987. She completed her training in plastic surgery between having four more children.

In October 2002, Wood was propelled into the media spotlight when the largest proportion of survivors from the 2002 Bali bombings arrived at Royal Perth Hospital. She led a team working to save 28 patients who had between 2 and 92 per cent body burns, deadly infections and delayed shock.

She was named a Member of the Order of Australia (AM) in 2003. She was named Australian of the Year for 2005 by Australian Prime Minister John Howard at a ceremony in Canberra to mark Australia Day.

In March 2007, following the crash landing of Garuda Indonesia Flight 200, Wood travelled to Yogyakarta, to assist in the emergency medical response for burn patients.

In 2006, she attracted criticism for publicly endorsing the drug brand "Nurofen". The profits from this endorsement went to the McComb Foundation, of which she was the chairwoman. The Australian Medical Association subsequently advised doctors against "endorsement of therapeutic goods". Wood later said of the endorsement that she "would not explore it again because I believe the negative perception outweighs the gain … I believe it was a mistake for me personally".

"Spray-on" skin
Wood has become well known for her patented invention of spray-on skin for burn patients, a treatment which is being continually developed. Where previous techniques of skin culturing required 21 days to produce enough cells to cover major burns, Wood has reduced the period to five days. Through research, she found that scarring is greatly reduced if replacement skin could be provided within 10 days. As a burns specialist the Holy Grail for Wood is "scarless woundless healing".

Wood started a company now called Avita Medical to commercialise the procedure. Her business came about after a schoolteacher arrived at Royal Perth Hospital in 1992 with petrol burns to 90% of his body. Wood turned to the emerging US-invented technology of cultured skin to save his life, working nights in a laboratory along with scientist Marie Stoner. The two women began to explore tissue engineering. They moved from growing skin sheets to spraying skin cells; earning a worldwide reputation as pioneers in their field. The company started operating in 1993 and now cultures small biopsies into bigger volumes of skin cell suspensions in as few as five days. This service is used by surgeons in Sydney, Auckland and Birmingham. Cells can be delivered via aircraft and ready for use the next day in many cases. Royalties from licensing will be ploughed back into a research fund, named the McComb Foundation.

As well as receiving much praise from both her own patients and the media, she also attracted controversy among other burns surgeons because spray-on skin had not yet been subjected to clinical trials. A clinical trial was planned in 2005 at Queen Victoria Hospital, England.

Awards and honours
 Wood was voted the most-trusted Australian in a Reader's Digest poll for six successive years from 2005 to 2010.
 She is an Australian Living Treasure. 
 In 2005, Wood won the Western Australia Citizen of the Year award for her contribution to Medicine in the field of burns research.
 In 2015, Wood was elected Fellow of the Australian Academy of Health and Medical Sciences.

References

External links
News report of the announcement
Royal Perth Hospital
Australian of the year website
Avita Medical

1958 births
Living people
20th-century English medical doctors
20th-century women physicians
21st-century English medical doctors
21st-century women physicians
Australian plastic surgeons
People from Perth, Western Australia
Academic staff of the University of Western Australia
Australian of the Year Award winners
Members of the Order of Australia
Australian women medical doctors
Australian medical doctors
English women medical doctors
People educated at Ackworth School
Alumni of St Thomas's Hospital Medical School
English emigrants to Australia
Fellows of the Australian Academy of Health and Medical Sciences
Fellows of King's College London
Women surgeons
20th-century surgeons
20th-century English women
20th-century English people
21st-century English women